Admiral Sir John Ashby (1646 – 12 June 1693) was an officer of the Royal Navy, who rose to the rank of Admiral. Ashby was the fourth son of Robert Ashby and his wife Alice, who was a sister of Sir Thomas Allin. He grew up in Suffolk where his father was involved in business.

Early career

He was subsequently a lieutenant aboard  in 1668 before being promoted to first comment on the ketch  in October that year.

Later career
Once aboard Pearl he fought his first battle at Schooneveld. His second battle was also at Schooneveld, but this time in HMS Lion, serving in Prince Rupert's division of the Red Squadron. His third battle was the Battle of Texel on 11 August 1673, where he fought again in HMS Lion.

From 1674 to 1679 he commanded four more ships in American waters, and played a part in numerous battles concerning the Virginian Revolution. From 1681 to 1684 he commanded  escorting the Levant trade. In May 1685 Ashby became the governor of Sandgate Castle.

Sir John also commanded  as she was mobilized to counter the rebellion of the Duke of Monmouth followed by the guardship , and then , the latter in response to the threatened invasion by William of Orange. Ashby was eventually convinced to command  for William of Orange, as he was persuaded of the need to fight the 'popish oppression' of the current king, James II. After William III was crowned, he knighted Ashby on-board his flagship on 16 May 1689 and made him rear admiral of the Red Squadron soon after. He also presented Ashby with a diamond watch.

Admiralty

His conduct was praised by Queen Mary. After the battle he was named joint admiral of the fleet with Sir Richard Haddock and Henry Killigrew.

At the battles of Battle of Barfleur and La Hogue he commanded HMS Victory as Admiral of the Blue. He was called before the House of Commons of England after Barfleur to give an account of why he had not done more to annihilate the French fleet. He was pardoned after he gained the support of Admiral Edward Russell.

From 1690 until his death three years later Ashby served on the Navy Board as Controller of Storekeepers Accounts. Ashby died on 12 June 1693 in Portsmouth and was buried at Lowestoft. In his will he left most of his possessions to his brother, and the rest to cousins and naval colleagues.

References

External links 
Maritime Memorials: Sir John Ashby

1646 births
1693 deaths
17th-century Royal Navy personnel
People from Lowestoft
Royal Navy admirals
Royal Navy personnel of the Third Anglo-Dutch War
British military personnel of the Nine Years' War